Drew Zingg (born 1957) is an American rock, blues, soul and jazz guitarist, best known for his performing with Steely Dan and Boz Scaggs.

Biography
Zingg was born and raised in New York City. Eventually he learned the guitar and spent about ten years doing the NY club scene, at times backing Shawn Colvin and Lucy Kaplansky. He also did some Broadway production and session work. Eventually, Zingg started playing in a band headed by keyboard player and vocalist Jeff Young. In 1989, Donald Fagen signed up Young and his band, which included Zingg, initially as the rhythm section for what eventually became Fagen's (along with his future wife Libby Titus) New York Rock and Soul Revue. Zingg can be heard on the 1991 album The New York Rock and Soul Revue: Live at the Beacon, which also features Michael McDonald, Phoebe Snow, and Boz Scaggs, among others. The NY Rock & Soul gigs led to Walter Becker coming to New York and joining the Revue in the summer of 1992. Then, Fagen and Becker decided to hit the road, touring as Steely Dan, with Zingg joining them on the tour as a lead guitarist and music director for about two years. Others joining this "Steely Dan Orchestra" were Warren Bernhardt on keyboards, Peter Erskine on drums, and Tom Barney on bass. In 1995, Steely Dan released a live album entitled Alive in America that was recorded during the 1993-1994 tours, with Zingg soloing on "Green Earrings"
and "Third World Man".

In 1996, Zingg started touring with Boz Scaggs. He can be heard on Boz's 2004 release Greatest Hits Live. He has also toured or recorded with Marcus Miller, Rickie Lee Jones, David Sanborn, Gladys Knight, Alana Davis, and Patti Austin.

Zingg went into the studio and recorded his first album, the self-titled Drew Zingg, released in 2012. It was produced and engineered by George Walker Petit, and recorded in multiple studios in New York City and California. Guest vocalists Michael McDonald and Boz Scaggs lend support, and the album includes the talents of George Whitty, Will Lee, and Vinnie Colaiuta. The album includes a previously unreleased instrumental tune written by Donald Fagen and Walter Becker, entitled "Megashine City", never officially recorded or released by Fagen and Becker. Zingg and band also cover the Lionel Richie tune "Easy". The album received fine reviews.

Discography
 Drew Zingg (The Infrangibile Syndicate, 2012)

As sideman
With Lucy Kaplansky
 The Tide (1994)
 Flesh and Bone (1996)

With Monkey House
 Headquarters (2012)
 Left (2016)

With Steely Dan
 The New York Rock and Soul Revue: Live at the Beacon – (1991)
 Alive in America (1995)

With others
 Lili Añel, Hi-Octane Coffee (2001)
 Alana Davis, Blame It on Me (1997)
 Adam Holzman, Overdrive (1994)
 Michael McDonald, The Voice of Michael McDonald (2001)
 Marcus Miller, Live & More (1998)
 Nelson Rangell, Nelson Rangell (1990)
 Boz Scaggs,  My Time: A Boz Scaggs Anthology (1997)

References

Living people
1957 births
American rock guitarists
American jazz guitarists
The New York Rock and Soul Revue members
Loomis Chaffee School alumni